A transatlantic tunnel is a theoretical tunnel that would span the Atlantic Ocean between North America and Europe possibly for such purposes as mass transit. Most conceptions of the tunnel envision it between the United States and the United Kingdom ‒ or more specifically between New York City and London.

The main barriers to constructing such a tunnel are cost first estimated $88–175 billion, now updated to $1–20 trillion, as well as limits of current materials science. Existing major tunnels, such as the Channel Tunnel, Seikan Tunnel and the Gotthard Base Tunnel, despite using less expensive technology than any yet proposed for the transatlantic tunnel, may struggle financially.

Proposed tunnels
Many variations of the concept exist, including a tube above the seabed, a tunnel beneath the ocean floor, or some combination of the two.

Vactrain

At this speed, the travel-time between New York City and London would be less than one hour. It would consist of 54,000 prefabricated sections held in place by 100,000 tethering cables. Each section would consist of a layer of foam sandwiched between concentric steel tubes, and the tunnel would also have reduced air pressure.

Jet propulsion
Ideas proposing rocket, jet, scramjet, and air-pressurized tunnels for train transportation have also been put forward. In the proposal described in an Extreme Engineering episode, trains would take 18 minutes to reach top speed, and 18 minutes at the end to come to a halt. During the deceleration phase, the resultant 0.2g acceleration would lead to an unpleasant feeling of tilting downward, and it was proposed that the seats would individually rotate to face backwards at the midpoint of the journey, in order to make the deceleration more pleasant.

History

Early interest
Suggestions for such a structure go back to Michel Verne, son of Jules Verne, who wrote about it in 1888 in a story entitled Un Express de l'avenir (An Express of the Future). This story was published in English in Strand Magazine in 1895, where it was incorrectly attributed to Jules Verne, a mistake frequently repeated today.
1913 saw the publication of the novel Der Tunnel by German author Bernhard Kellermann. It inspired four films of the same name: one in 1915 by William Wauer, and separate German, French, and British versions released in 1933 and 1935. The German and French versions were directed by Curtis Bernhardt, and the British one was written in part by science fiction writer Curt Siodmak. Perhaps suggesting contemporary interest in the topic, an original poster for the American release of the British version (renamed Transatlantic Tunnel) was, in 2006, estimated for auction at $2,000–3,000.

Modern research
Robert H. Goddard, the father of rocketry, was issued two of his 214 patents for the idea.
Arthur C. Clarke mentioned intercontinental tunnels in his 1946 short story Rescue Party and again in his 1956 novel The City and the Stars. Harry Harrison's 1975 novel Tunnel Through the Deeps (also published as A Transatlantic Tunnel, Hurrah!) describes a vacuum/maglev system on the ocean floor.
The April 2004 issue of Popular Science suggests that a transatlantic tunnel is more feasible than previously thought, and without major engineering challenges. It compares it favorably with laying transatlantic pipes and cables, but with a cost of 88 to 175 billion dollars. In 2003, the Discovery Channel's show Extreme Engineering aired a program, titled "Transatlantic Tunnel", which discussed the proposed tunnel concept in detail.

References

External links
 

Megastructures
Proposed undersea tunnels in Europe
Proposed undersea tunnels in North America
Proposed transcontinental crossings
Science fiction themes
Tunnel